Bulciago is a comune (municipality) in the Province of Lecco in the Italian region Lombardy, located about  northeast of Milan and about  southwest of Lecco.

Bulciago borders the following municipalities: Barzago, Cassago Brianza, Costa Masnaga, Cremella, Garbagnate Monastero, Nibionno.

Demographic evolution

Famous citizens
Vittorio Arrigoni, Italian reporter, activist and writer

References

Cities and towns in Lombardy